Matt Walker is an ARIA Award-winning Australian blues musician.

Career
Walker began playing music in public at the age of 14 at the Selby Folk Club. He played at Port Fairy Folk Festival, National Folk Festival, Bridgetown Blues Festival, East Coast Blues and Roots Festival until the age of 18.Walker joined The Broderick Smith Band playing dobro, guitar and lap steel and toured extensively around Australia. Walker played on and wrote music for Broderick Smith albums My Shiralee, Songster and Crayon Angels from 1994 to 1996.

In 1995, Walker recorded Live at the Rainbow with Ashley Davies on drums, Andrew Entsch on double bass and Jerry Hale on fiddle and guitar before recording There's Life in 1996.

In 1997, Walker released I Listen to the Night with Ashley Davies. At the ARIA Music Awards of 1998, I Listen to the Night was nominated for two ARIA Awards. In 1998 and 1999, Walker toured across Europe and North America.

In 2000, Walker recorded Soul Witness with Ashley Davies on drums, Chris Abrahams on piano and Ken Gormley on bass and toured with this line up. At the ARIA Music Awards of 2000, Soul Witness won the ARIA Award for Best Blues and Roots Album.

In 2003, Walker formed the electric trio The Necessary Few with Grant Cummerford on bass and Roger Bergodaz on drums and recorded the album Navigational Skills.

Walker contributed songs for the soundtrack Australian Rules, which won the ARIA Award for Best Original Soundtrack, Cast or Show Album at the 2003 awards. Walker contributed two original songs for the Australian film Somersault in 2004.

On 5 September 2005, Walker and Davis released the self-titled album on Walker's label Stovepipe Records.

Since 2013, Walker has been part of and releasing music under Lost Ragas. The Lost Ragas are Matt Walker, Shane Reilly, Simon Burke and Roger Bergodaz.

While predominantly known as a musician and singer-songwriter, Matt Walker is also an accomplished and in-demand music producer whose credits include Broderick Smith, Mick Daley, Liz Stringer's Pendulum and the Ben Mitchell AKA Benjamin Grant Mitchell 2019 release, Slow Is The New Fast.

Discography

Awards

ARIA Music Awards
The ARIA Music Awards is an annual awards ceremony that recognises excellence, innovation, and achievement across all genres of Australian music. Walker has won 1 awards from 3 nominations.

|-
| rowspan="2"| 1998
| rowspan="2"| I Listen to the Night
| Best Blues and Roots Album
| 
|-
| Best World Music Album
| 
|-
| 2000
| Soul Witness
| Best Blues and Roots Album
| 
|-

References

External links
Matt Walker Official website

1973 births
Living people
ARIA Award winners
21st-century Australian singers
21st-century Australian male singers
Australian harmonica players